Cruiserweight is a term associated with:

Cruiserweight (boxing), a weight class in boxing between light heavyweight and heavyweight
Cruiserweight (professional wrestling), a wrestler weighing below heavyweight
Cruiserweight (band), an American rock band from Austin, Texas